Matej Mitrović (born 10 November 1993) is a Croatian professional footballer who plays as a defender for Prva HNL side Rijeka and the Croatia national team.

Club career
Mitrović made his professional debut for Cibalia on 25 February 2012, aged 18, coming on as a substitute in an away win against Slaven Belupo. In September 2013, he signed a two-year contract with Rijeka in the Prva HNL. During his first season with Rijeka, Mitrović was member of the squad that won the Croatian Cup, scoring in the final against Dinamo Zagreb. In June 2016, he signed a new three-year contract which ties him with the club until June 2019. On 6 January 2017, he moved to Beşiktaş on a three-year deal for  4.2 million.

On 29 January 2018, Mitrović joined Belgian club Club Brugge on a six-month long loan deal. On 20 July, he signed permanently for the club after agreeing to a four-year deal.

On 1 July 2022, Mitrović returned to Rijeka.

International career
In November 2014, Mitrović received his first senior national team call-up, when Niko Kovač called him up as an injury replacement for Gordon Schildenfeld. He made his Croatia debut in a friendly against Argentina on 12 November 2014. In October 2016, Mitrović was called up by Ante Čačić as an injury replacement for Dejan Lovren for 2018 FIFA World Cup qualifiers against Kosovo and Finland. On 6 October 2016, he scored his first international goal in the match against Kosovo.

In May 2018, he was named in Croatia’s preliminary 32-man squad for the 2018 FIFA World Cup in Russia. However, he did not make the final 23. His most recent international was an October 2018 friendly match against Jordan.

Career statistics

Club

International

Croatia score listed first, score column indicates score after each Mitrović goal

Honours
Rijeka
Croatian Football Cup: 2013–14
Croatian Football Super Cup: 2014

Beşiktaş
Süper Lig: 2016–17

Club Brugge
Belgian First Division A: 2017–18, 2019–20, 2020–21
Belgian Super Cup: 2018, 2021

Individual
Team of the Year: 2015

References

External links
 

1993 births
Living people
People from Požega, Croatia
Association football defenders
Croatian footballers
Croatia youth international footballers
Croatia under-21 international footballers
Croatia international footballers
HNK Cibalia players
HNK Rijeka players
Beşiktaş J.K. footballers
Club Brugge KV players
Croatian Football League players
Süper Lig players
Belgian Pro League players
Croatian expatriate footballers
Expatriate footballers in Turkey
Croatian expatriate sportspeople in Turkey
Expatriate footballers in Belgium
Croatian expatriate sportspeople in Belgium